Meadow Woods station is a train station in the community of Meadow Woods, Florida. It is located along the southern phase of SunRail, the commuter rail service of Greater Orlando. The station is named after the community where it is located.

The station held a train tour with an open house on June 23, 2018, and revenue service commenced on 30 July 2018.

The station has been rumored to be one of the two Orlando-area stops for Brightline's prospective service from Orlando to Tampa, along with the South Airport Intermodal Terminal located at Orlando International Airport.

References

Railway stations in the United States opened in 2018
SunRail stations
Greater Orlando